Ennealophus  is a genus of perennial, herbaceous and bulbous plants in the family Iridaceae.  It consists in five species distributed from Ecuador to Northern Brazil and Northwest Argentina. The genus name is derived from the Greek words ennea, meaning "nine", and lophus, meaning "crest".

List of species
The species of the genus and their geographic distribution is the following: 
Ennealophus boliviensis (Baker) Ravenna, Notas Mens. Mus. Nac. Hist. Nat. (Chile) 21: 8 (1977). Bolivia. 
Ennealophus euryandrus (Griseb.) Ravenna, Anales Mus. Hist. Nat. Valparaiso 6: 42 (1973). Northwest Argentina. 
Ennealophus fimbriatus Ravenna, Wrightia 7: 232 (1983). Northwest de Argentina. 
Ennealophus foliosus (Kunth) Ravenna, Notas Mens. Mus. Nac. Hist. Nat. (Chile) 21: 8 (1977). Ecuador to Perú and Northern Brazil. 
Ennealophus simplex (Ravenna) Roitman & J.A.Castillo, Darwiniana 45: 238 (2007). Northwest Argentina (Jujuy, Tucumán). It is a synonym of Tucma simplex Ravenna.

References

Bibliography
Chiarini, Franco E. El cariotipo de Ennealophus fimbriatus (Iridaceae). Arnaldoa, ene./dic. 2005, vol.12, no.1-2, p. 48-52. ISSN 1815-8242.
Ravenna P. 1983. A new species and a new subgenus in Ennealophus (Iridaceae). Wrightia, 7. (3): 232-234

Iridaceae genera
Iridaceae
Taxa named by N. E. Brown